Chilla (both literally "forty"), also known as Chilla-nashini, is a spiritual practice of penance and solitude in Sufism known mostly in Indian and Persian traditions. In this ritual a mendicant or ascetic attempts to remain seated in a circle practicing meditation techniques without food for 40 days and nights in imitation of the Arba'een. The word chilla is derived from the Persian word chehel "forty". Chilla is commonly performed in a solitary cell called a chilla-khana. The main purpose of chilla is to attain laser like focus and get rid of unnecessary thoughts in your mind.

Incidents of Chilla 
The most famous case of chilla is found in the biographies of the 14th century Sufi poet Hafez of Shiraz.

In music 
A practice similar to chilla is also performed by Hindustani classical music practitioners at an advanced level. It is called chilla katna.

See also 
 Khalwa
 Meditation
 Sādhanā
 Shugendō
 Tabligh Jamaat

References

Bibliography
 
 

Religious practices
Ritual purification
Asceticism
Sufism